The Estádio Olímpico do Pará, also known as Mangueirão and Estádio Estadual Jornalista Edgar Augusto Proença (State Stadium Edgar Augusto Proença, in English) is a football stadium inaugurated on March 4, 1978 in Belém, Pará, with a maximum capacity of 45,007 spectators.

The stadium is owned by the Pará State Government, and is the home ground of Paysandu Sport Club, Clube do Remo and Sport Club Belém. Its formal name honors Edgar Proença, a journalist and sport announcer of Pará state, and the founder of Rádio Paraense, the first Pará radio station.

History

The Mangueirão stadium architectonical project is from August 1969. The Stadium was designed by Alcyr Meira, a local architect. The Pará State Governor of that time, Alacid Nunes ordered a 120,000 people football stadium construction project. The works started in 1970, when were built the ditch, the field and the general bleachers. A year later, the project was changed, and the stadium maximum capacity was reduced from 120,000 to 70,000. In 1971 the construction works restarted, with the construction of the first structural module.

In 2002, 24 years after the stadium inauguration, Mangueirão was reinaugurated as an olympic stadium. R$30 million were spent by the government of Pará state.

Mangueirão's most important match was the first leg of Copa dos Campeões final, played on July 31, 2002, when Cruzeiro beat Paysandu 2-1.

The inaugural match was played on March 4, 1978, when a Pará State all-stars team beat a Youngsters Uruguay national team 4-0. The first goal of the stadium was scored by Pará's Mesquita.

The reinaugural match was played on May 1, 2002, when Remo and Paysandu drew 2-2. The first goal of the stadium after the reinauguration was scored by Remo's Balão.

The stadium's attendance record currently stands at 65,000, set on July 11, 1999 Remo vs. Paysandu match.

The stadium's attendance record after the reinauguration currently stands at 57,248, when Boca Juniors beat Paysandu 4-2.

Brazil national football team

See also
Grande Premio Brasil Caixa de Atletismo

References

Enciclopédia do Futebol Brasileiro, Volume 2 - Lance, Rio de Janeiro: Aretê Editorial S/A, 2001.
 Templos do Futebol

External links

Templos do Futebol
Fiel Bicolor

Football venues in Pará
Estadio Olimpico Do Para
Paysandu
Clube do Remo
Tuna Luso Brasileira